Yankeetown is a town in Levy County, Florida, United States. In the 2020 census, the population was 588.

History
Yankeetown was founded in 1923 by the Indiana politician and lawyer Armanis F. Knotts, who moved to the area because of his great love for hunting. The settlement was originally named Knotts for the founder. However, stories have it that the present name comes from a local mail carrier, an "unreconstructed Confederate," who frequently and derisively directed visitors to the settlement that he called "that Yankee town." Yankeetown was initially to be western end of a 1930s proposed, but never actualized, Cross Florida Canal.

Geography

Yankeetown is located at  (29.031155, –82.720104). The outermost reaches of the town are located around the mouth of the Withlacoochee River and along the Gulf of Mexico.

Demographics

As of the 2020 census, Yankeetown had a population of 588 with 292 households. The median household income was $44,318. There was an employment rate of 30.2%. 28.9% of the population lived below the Poverty threshold.

28.2% of the population 25 years or older had a Bachelor’s degree or higher. 11.9% of the population were without Health Care Coverage. The median age was 56.0. 

11.9% of the population were veterans. 1.8% of the population were foreign born persons.

Education

School Board of Levy County operates the PK–8 Yankeetown School.
The Yankeetown Inglis Woman's Club provides Yankeetown and Inglis with the local AF Knotts Public Library. The YIWC has a contract with Levy County who provides staffing and books for the local library. The YI Woman's Club is believed to be the last woman's club in the US to own and maintain a public library for their community.  The original library opened in 1959 with 1,000 donated books   The A.F. Knotts Public Library was named in honor of the town's founder; Armanis F. Knotts in 1975 by his nephew Eugene Knotts.

References

External links
 Town of Yankeetown official website
 Yankeetown community website
 Save Yankeetown
 "Free software and politics in Yankeetown" (2006), at Freesoftwaremagazine.com

Towns in Levy County, Florida
Towns in Florida
Populated coastal places in Florida on the Gulf of Mexico
Populated places established in 1923
1923 establishments in Florida